The 1976 IAAF World Cross Country Championships was held in Chepstow, Wales, at the Chepstow Racecourse on 28 February 1976.   A report on the event was given in the Glasgow Herald.

Complete results for men, junior men,  women, medallists, 
 and the results of British athletes were published.

Medallists

Race results

Senior men's race (12 km)

Note: Athletes in parentheses did not score for the team result

Junior men's race (7.8 km)

Note: Athletes in parentheses did not score for the team result

Senior women's race (4.8 km)

Note: Athletes in parentheses did not score for the team result

Medal table (unofficial)

Note: Totals include both individual and team medals, with medals in the team competition counting as one medal.

Participation
An unofficial count yields the participation of 306 athletes from 21 countries.  This is in agreement with the official numbers as published.

 (14)
 (21)
 (5)
 (6)
 (21)
 (18)
 (21)
 (19)
 (19)
 (15)
 (10)
 (6)
 (8)
 (20)
 (11)
 (20)
 (7)
 (9)
 (21)
 (21)
 (14)

See also
 1976 IAAF World Cross Country Championships – Senior men's race
 1976 IAAF World Cross Country Championships – Junior men's race
 1976 IAAF World Cross Country Championships – Senior women's race
 1976 in athletics (track and field)

References

External links 
GBRathletics

 
World Athletics Cross Country Championships
C
Chepstow
IAAF World Cross Country Championships
IAAF World Cross Country Championships
International athletics competitions hosted by Wales
Cross country running in the United Kingdom